Axel Skalstad (born 1992) is a Norwegian jazz and prog-rock drummer. He was born in Fiskum. He is mainly known as a member of the trio Krokofant with guitarist Tom Hasslan and saxophonist Jørgen Mathisen.

Discography 
 With Soft Ffog
 2022: Soft Ffog (Is It Jazz? Records)

 With Krokofant
 2014: Krokofant (Rune Grammofon)
 2015: Krokofant - II (Rune Grammofon)
 2017: Krokofant - III (Rune Grammofon)

 With Sjøen
 2014: Live I (Havtorn Records)

 With LoveLoveLove
 2014: Kaleidoscope (Kakao musikk)

 With Rune Your Day
 2017: Rune Your Day (Clean Feed)

 With Pekula
 2018: Vol. 1 - ARP (Pekula Records)

References

External links 
 Axel Skalstad: PSS – 80.
 Krokofant med Storløkken og Håker Flaten at YouTube

21st-century Norwegian drummers
Norwegian jazz drummers
Norwegian composers
Norwegian male composers
1992 births
Living people
People from Buskerud
21st-century Norwegian male musicians